Events from the year 1866 in France.

Events
31 May - Napoleon III announces the withdrawal of French forces in the French intervention in Mexico.
26 July - French evacuate Monterrey.
5 August - French evacuate Saltillo.
14 October - French troops land at Ganghwa Island, Korea as part of French Campaign against Korea for the execution of French Jesuit priests. It is the first military contact between Korea and a Western force.

Arts and literature
31 October - Jacques Offenbach's opéra bouffe La Vie parisienne is premiered at the Théâtre du Palais-Royal in Paris.

Births
29 January - Romain Rolland, writer, Nobel Prize in Literature (died 1944)
19 February – Louis-Henri Foreau, painter (died 1938)
17 May - Erik Satie, composer and pianist (died 1925)
23 May – Ellen Richards Ridgway, American golfer (died 1934)
6 July - Charles Mangin, general during World War I (died 1925)
13 July - La Goulue, dancer (died 1929)
4 August - Maurice Schutz, actor (died 1955)
7 September - Tristan Bernard, playwright, novelist, journalist and lawyer (died 1947)
21 September - Charles Nicolle, bacteriologist who won the 1928 Nobel Prize in Medicine (died 1936)

Deaths
8 March - Siméon-François Berneux, Roman Catholic missionary killed in Korea (born 1814).
11 August - Philippe Buchez, author and politician (born 1796).

References

1860s in France